Yuliya Konstantinovna Kolosovskaya (7 August 1920 – 29 March 2002) was a Soviet and Russian historian of classical antiquity. Kolosovskaya researched the history of Roman provinces on the Danube, especially Dacia and Pannonia. She was instrumental in establishing that the Romans left Dacia gradually, starting from the time of Gordian III, and not immediately. Kolosovskaya also studied provincial Roman epigraphy. From 1989 until her death, she was a member of the editorial board of the Journal of Ancient History.

Kolosovskaya was born in Naro-Fominsk. In 1934, her family moved to Moscow. Having finished the school in 1938, she graduated from the Moscow State University. Kolosovskaya began her scholar career under the guidance of Nikolai Mashkin. She authored over fifty scholar publications about ancient Rome.

References

Sources

1920 births
2002 deaths
Women classical scholars
Soviet historians
20th-century Russian historians
Russian women historians
People from Naro-Fominsky District
Moscow State University alumni
20th-century Russian women writers
Historians of ancient Rome
Russian scholars of Roman history